The genus Helwingia consists of shrubs or rarely small trees native to eastern Asia, the Himalayas, and northern Indochina. It is the only genus in the family Helwingiaceae.

Description
The plants have alternate, evergreen or deciduous leaves and small inflorescences that are epiphyllous (growing from the leaf surface). During development, the flowers appear separate from the leaves, but eventually fuse with the leaf midrib. Flowers are small and yellow-green or purple, followed by red or black berries. Plants are dioecious.

Epiphyllous inflorescences
This trait is rather unusual among plants. This strange floral position upon a leaf is believed to be an adaption to insect pollination. Pollinators, which are too large for the flowers, land on the leaf surfaces and can pollinate the flowers, which would not be able to support the pollinators themselves.

Taxonomy
The APG II classification (2003) places them in the order Aquifoliales, along with the hollies and Phyllonomaceae, which also has epiphyllous flowers.

The family Helwingiaceae does not exist in the
Cronquist classification (1981), which places this genus in the Cornaceae (dogwood family). Helwingia has also previously been placed in the Araliaceae (ginseng family).

The family is named for botanist Georg Andreas Helwing.

Species
Species adapted from the World Checklist of Selected Plant Families:
 Helwingia chinensis Batalin - Thailand, Myanmar, China: Gansu, Guizhou, Hubei, Hunan, Shaanxi, Sichuan, Tibet, Yunnan
 Helwingia himalaica Hook.f. & Thomson ex C.B.Clarke - Thailand, Myanmar, Bhutan, Nepal, India: Assam, Sikkim, China: Tibet, Chongqing, Guangdong, Guangxi, Guizhou, Hubei, Hunan, Sichuan, Yunnan
 Helwingia japonica (Thunb.) F.Dietr. - Japan (incl. Ryukyu Islands), Korea, Taiwan, Myanmar, Bhutan, Vietnam, India: Assam, Sikkim, China: Anhui, Fujian, Gansu, Guangdong, Guangxi, Guizhou, Henan, Hubei, Hunan, Jiangsu, Jiangxi, Shaanxi, Shandong, Shanxi, Sichuan, Yunnan, Zhejiang
 Helwingia omeiensis (W.P.Fang) H.Hara & S.Kuros. - China: Gansu, Guangxi, Guizhou, Hubei, Hunan, Shaanxi, Sichuan, Yunnan

References

External links

Aquifoliales - Angiosperm Phylogeny Website, consulted 2007-01-26.
Helwingiaceae , Watson, L., and Dallwitz, M.J. 1992 onwards. The families of flowering plants: descriptions, illustrations, identification, and information retrieval. Version: 29 July 2006.
 Also see Cornaceae 
Helwingiaceae from NCBI-Taxonomy
Helwingiaceae, USDA, ARS, National Genetic Resources Program. Germplasm Resources Information Network - (GRIN Online Database). National Germplasm Resources Laboratory, Beltsville, Maryland. Consulted 2007-01-26.

Aquifoliales
Asterid genera
Dioecious plants